Alfred Dickinson (17 August 1914 – 1998) was a Welsh footballer who played at inside-forward for Port Vale, Everton, and Northampton Town.

Career
Dickinson played for Everton, before joining Port Vale in September 1936. He played five Third Division North games before picking up an injury and returning to Goodison Park the following month. He later played for Northampton Town, and guested for Chester and Wrexham during the war.

Career statistics
Source:

References

People from Saltney
Sportspeople from Flintshire
Welsh footballers
Association football forwards
Everton F.C. players
Port Vale F.C. players
Northampton Town F.C. players
Chester City F.C. wartime guest players
Wrexham F.C. wartime guest players
English Football League players
1914 births
1998 deaths